The Daily Independent was a newspaper that operated from Kimberley in the Cape Colony, from 1875 to 1893.

References

Defunct newspapers published in South Africa
Publications established in 1875
Publications disestablished in 1893
1875 establishments in the Cape Colony
1893 disestablishments in the Cape Colony